Bridge in Albany Township, also known as Trexler Bridge, is a historic stone arch bridge located at Albany Township in Berks County, Pennsylvania. It is a multiple span , stone arch bridge with three spans, constructed in 1841. It crosses Maiden Creek.

It was listed on the National Register of Historic Places in 1988.  It is located in the Trexler Historic District.

References 

Road bridges on the National Register of Historic Places in Pennsylvania
Bridges completed in 1841
Bridges in Berks County, Pennsylvania
National Register of Historic Places in Berks County, Pennsylvania
Stone arch bridges in the United States